The Rural Municipality of Mount Pleasant No. 2 is a rural municipality (RM) in the Canadian province of Saskatchewan within Census Division No. 1 and  Division No. 1. Located in the southeast portion of the province, it is adjacent to the United States border, neighbouring Renville County in North Dakota.

History 
The RM of Mount Pleasant No. 2 incorporated as a rural municipality on December 11, 1911.

Geography

Communities and localities 
The following urban municipalities are surrounded by the RM.

Towns
 Carnduff

Villages
 Carievale

The following unincorporated communities are within the RM.

Localities
 Elmore

Demographics 

Government 
The RM of Mount Pleasant No. 2 is governed by an elected municipal council and an appointed administrator that meets on the second Tuesday of every month. The reeve of the RM is Chad Baglole while its administrator is Lydia M. Hammell. The RM's office is located in Carnduff.

See also 
List of rural municipalities in Saskatchewan

References

External links 

M
Division No. 1, Saskatchewan